Daifuku is a Japanese confection.

Daifuku may also refer to:

Daifuku (company), a Japanese material-handling equipment company
Daifuku Station, a train station in Sakurai, Nara Prefecture, Japan
Daifuku-ji, a Buddhist temple located in Tateyama, Chiba Prefecture, Japan
Daifukuji Soto Zen Mission, a Zen Buddhist temple on the island of Hawaii